Destin Wilson Sandlin (born September 17, 1981) is an American engineer and science communicator who produces the video series Smarter Every Day on his YouTube channel of the same name, which was launched in 2007. Sandlin also runs the YouTube channels The Sound Traveler, Smarter Every Day 2, and a podcast called No Dumb Questions with his friend Matt Whitman.

In early 2016, Sandlin was one of three YouTube personalities chosen to conduct a one-on-one interview with then-president Barack Obama after his final State of the Union address.

Background
Sandlin has a BS in mechanical engineering from the University of Alabama and an MS in aerospace engineering from the University of Alabama in Huntsville. While an undergraduate, he was awarded the University of Alabama's Outstanding Senior Award. He also minored in Business Administration while at the University of Alabama. Sandlin was, until late 2018, a full-time Missile Flight Test Engineer at Redstone Arsenal. He is currently a PhD candidate at the University of Alabama Huntsville advised by Kavan Hazeli.

YouTube channels and podcast

Smarter Every Day

Sandlin began posting educational videos in 2007. His first video reached one million views on July 10, 2009.

Sandlin formally launched the Smarter Every Day series on April 24, 2011, with a video titled "Detonation vs Deflagration - Smarter Every Day 1," which became the title format for subsequent videos and the sole focus of his YouTube channel. Episodes of Smarter Every Day feature Sandlin as the host and narrator, and revolve around scientific exploration and discovery. Sandlin's primary interest and educational background is in flight and space, which appear frequently in his videos. Other notable topics have included the submarine USS Toledo (SSN-769), the effects of hypoxia on the human brain, the Prince Rupert's drop, the physics of potato guns, the usefulness of snatch blocks, and a nearly-impossible to ride bicycle whose wheel steers in the opposite direction of its handle bars.

No Dumb Questions
In 2017, Sandlin began a podcast with his best friend from Wyoming, Matt Whitman. Whitman also runs the YouTube channel The Ten Minute Bible Hour.

Personal life
Sandlin was born and raised in Huntsville, Alabama, and currently lives there with his wife Tara, their two daughters, and two sons. Destin and Tara formerly lived in nearby Cullman.

Sandlin's family often appears in his videos. Since 2012, Sandlin has supported and partnered with "Not Forgotten", a charity that cares for orphaned boys in Peru.

Sandlin is an avid fan of the University of Alabama.

Sandlin is a devout Christian. Sandlin spoke at the 2015 Skepticon on his personal reconciliation of the search for scientific truth with his faith.

References

External links
 
 
 No Dumb Questions, the podcast Sandlin co-hosts with Matt Whitman

1981 births
21st-century American engineers
American Christians
American podcasters
American YouTubers
Articles containing video clips
Living people
Online edutainment
People from Huntsville, Alabama
Science communicators
University of Alabama alumni
University of Alabama in Huntsville alumni
Science-related YouTube channels